Shimla Airport  is a regional airport located in Jubbarhatti,  from Shimla, in the Indian state of Himachal Pradesh.

Kingfisher Airlines used to operate the sole daily flight from Delhi, but could not carry more than 28 passengers on its return journey because of load restrictions imposed on the aircraft due to Shimla's high altitude. It ceased operations to Shimla in September 2012.

On April 27, 2017, commercial service was resumed by Alliance Air but then suspended it on March 2020. The airline was expected to resume the service from 15 August 2022, but was delayed again due to some problems with the airline. The airline finally resumed the flight service to Delhi on 26 September 2022. Alongside the airline, helicopter service is also provided by Pawan Hans.

Airlines and destinations

Statistics

References

External links 
Shimla Airport - India Airport global website

Transport in Shimla
Airports in Himachal Pradesh
Buildings and structures in Shimla
Airports with year of establishment missing